Criss-Cross was an artists' co-operative that was formed in Colorado, USA, in the early 1970s. Having evolved from the 1960s artists' community, Drop City, Criss-Cross focused on issues surrounding "pattern and structure" and became associated with the 1970s art movement Pattern and Decoration (P&D). 

In 1974, the five founders, Gene Bernofsky, JoAnn Bernofsky, Richard Kallweit, Charles DiJulio and Clark Richert, artists and filmmakers from Drop City, regrouped in Boulder, Colorado, to start the new artists' co-operative, Criss-Cross. Its purpose, like Drop City's, was to function in a "synergetic" interaction between peers to create experimental artistic innovation. Between 1974 and 1980, the number of participants grew to include the filmmaker Fred Worden (included in the 2002 Whitney Biennial), the University of Arkansas painter/printmaker Marilyn Nelson, and the New York artists Gloria Klein, George Woodman, Mary Ann Unger and others. 

Between 1974 and 1980, Criss-Cross published the nationally distributed avant garde art periodical Criss-Cross Art Communications and curated national and international art exhibitions focused on "pattern and structure".

Criss-Cross constructed the first "61-Zone System" (in collaboration with Steve Baer of ZomeWorks of Albuquerque, New Mexico) at the Art Research Center in Kansas City.

Members of Criss-Cross included:

References 
 Michael Paglia, "Paint by Numbers" 
 Michael Paglia, (July 29, 1999), "Flash Point" 
 Michael Paglia, "Cut-Ups", Denver Westword, March 17, 2005

Artist cooperatives in the United States
Contemporary art organizations
Colorado culture